The Amish is a 2012 documentary film created by PBS as an episode (Season 24, Episode 5) of American Experience. The documentary, as the title implies, is centered on the Amish. It was uploaded on the PBS website in February 2012. Topics in the video range from the Ordnung to the Nickel Mines shooting to Rumspringa. The documentary was written and directed by David Belton. The documentary includes interviews of current and former Amish. A companion book was released in 2013.

References

External links
 

2012 television films
2012 films
American documentary television films
Amish in popular culture
American Experience
2010s English-language films